Montevideo is an unincorporated community in Elbert and Hart counties, in the U.S. state of Georgia.

History
A post office called Montevideo was established in 1857, and remained in operation until 1903. The community's name is a transfer from Montevideo, in Uruguay.

References

Unincorporated communities in Elbert County, Georgia
Unincorporated communities in Hart County, Georgia
Unincorporated communities in Georgia (U.S. state)